Mahmoud Fawzi (19 September 1900 – 12 June 1981) was an Egyptian diplomat and political figure who was Prime Minister of Egypt from 1970 to 1972 and the vice president of Egypt from 1972 to 1974.

Biography
Fawzi was born in a village near Quwaysina, Monufia Governorate. His father was a graduate of Dar al'Ulum and the Shari'a Judges School. He studied law at the University of Cairo. He did his postgraduate studies at the Universities of Liverpool, Columbia, and Rome, and received a PhD in criminal law in 1926.

He served in many diplomatic posts as a young man, including Egyptian Consul in the Egyptian Consulate in Kobe, Japan, in the early 1930s, beginning in 1926. In 1942 he was appointed Egyptian consul-general in Jerusalem. He became Egyptian representative to the United Nations in 1947 and ambassador to the United Kingdom in 1952. In late 1952 he became foreign minister of Egypt under its new leader, Gamal Abdel Nasser. Fawzi was appointed largely because of his fluency in languages, and was known to avoid involvement in politics, always remaining a diplomat.

Fawzi served as foreign minister of Egypt until 1958 when the United Arab Republic, a union between Egypt and Syria was formed. Fawzi served as foreign minister of the United Arab Republic until its collapse  in 1961. He remained in office until 1964. After that he remained a close advisor to Nasser on foreign affairs. Upon Nasser's death in 1970, Fawzi was appointed prime minister by his successor, Anwar Sadat, as a compromise civilian candidate. Fawzi served as prime minister until January 1972 and then served as vice-president of Egypt until his retirement in 1974. He wrote a book entitled "Suez War" about the 1956 crisis with Israel over the Suez Canal and it was published after his death in 1981.

Honour

Foreign honour
 Malaysia: 
 Honorary Commander of the Order of the Defender of the Realm (PMN (K)) - Tan Sri (1965)

References
General

Specific

External links

1900 births
1981 deaths
20th-century prime ministers of Egypt
Vice-presidents of Egypt
Prime Ministers of Egypt
Foreign ministers of Egypt
Ambassadors of Egypt to the United Kingdom
Permanent Representatives of Egypt to the United Nations
Politicians from Cairo
Arab Socialist Union (Egypt) politicians
Honorary Commanders of the Order of the Defender of the Realm
Diplomats from Cairo